Yemişanlı may refer to:
Yemişanlı, Oghuz, Azerbaijan
Yemişanlı, Qabala, Azerbaijan